The Dean Bulldogs football team represents Dean College in college football at the NCAA Division III level. The Bulldogs are members of the Eastern Collegiate Football Conference (ECFC), fielding its team in the ECFC since 2016. The Bulldogs play their home games at Dale Lippert Field in Franklin, Massachusetts.

Their head coach is Andrae Murphy, who took over the position for the 2022 season.

Conference affiliations
 Unknown (1957–1997)
 Northeast JC Football Conference (1998–2015)
 Eastern Collegiate Football Conference (2016–present)

List of head coaches

Key

Coaches

Year-by-year results

Notes

References

External links
 

 
1957 establishments in Massachusetts
American football teams established in 1957